John G. Gilbert (January 8, 1864 – November 12, 1903) was a Major League Baseball shortstop. He played in two games for the Pittsburgh Alleghenys, both on June 23, 1890. He started both ends of a doubleheader against the Philadelphia Phillies, collecting eight at bats without a hit. His brother Harry H. Gilbert was his teammate on that team. The Pittsburgh Alleghenies later became the Pittsburgh Pirates.

Sources

Major League Baseball shortstops
Pittsburgh Alleghenys players
Hazleton Pugilists players
Baseball players from Pennsylvania
People from Pottstown, Pennsylvania
1864 births
1903 deaths
Sportspeople from Montgomery County, Pennsylvania